Violeta Rosa Ester Vidaurre Heiremans (12 September 1928 – 1 June 2021), better known as Violeta Vidaurre, was a Chilean actress with a long television and theater career, with more than 120 characters played since her debut.

For three decades, Vidaurre established herself as one of the most important theater actresses in the cast of the Catholic University's , collaborating with Eugenio Dittborn, Eugenio Guzmán, Hugo Miller, Víctor Jara, and the American Frank McMullan. After the dictatorship she began to work in various university productions and independent companies.

In 2015, she was the only woman to be a candidate (out of five selected) for the National Prize for Performing and Audiovisual Arts, whose winner was actor Héctor Noguera. In the same year, she received several tributes and recognitions for her vast career in the performing arts.

Her last performances included appearances in various television series and some valued performances in independent theater companies, allowing herself to be honored in each presentation.

Biography

Early years and childhood
Born of the marriage formed by Víctor Vidaurre Coo and Rosa Violeta Heiremans Brockman, of Belgian and German origin, Violeta Vidaurre was the eldest of three siblings and a cousin of the doctor, actor, storyteller, novelist and playwright  and the businessman . On her childhood the actress said, "I was always very pampered by my parents, but the one with whom I had more complicity and affinity was my dad. Sometimes I think I was in love with him."

Coming from an aristocratic or upper-class family from Santiago's , her basic education took place at the Colegio Sagrado Corazón, Villa María Academy, and Sacred Heart of Argentine nuns. "In school plays they never gave me the role to represent the Virgin, because I had bad behavior. I suffered a lot because of that, but in the end I was reassured because the house had a good time when we made the sets with costumes and wigs." Since she was a child, she showed her acting skills with her cousin Luis Alberto, who wrote and performed plays that were staged at her grandfather's house, as in the case of Atahuicha, la reina de la selva, which Luis Alberto wrote and directed.

Vidaurre entered into her first marriage at age 19 with Ramón Salgado Suárez, a marine guard of the school ship Lautaro, which caught fire before his eyes off Callao in 1945. "In those years I valued my marriage and I did not go to study theater although I liked it. Only at the age of 28 Luis Alberto convinced me to enter to study theater, and then I started replacing actresses until this became a real passion."

Artistic career
In this process, she was a colleague of Paz Yrarrázabal – later school director,  – 2009 National Art Prize winner, and Héctor Noguera – 2015 Performing Arts Prize winner, among others. She took to the massive stages replacing some actresses, and was cast in a role by the American director Frank McMullan, who had been invited to direct the play Look Homeward, Angel by Thomas Wolfe in 1959.

After completing her academic training and role in Look Homeward, Angel, she was able to quickly join the cast of actors of the Experimental Theater with Ana González, Nelly Meruane, Justo Ugarte, Maruja Cifuentes, and others. Since then, she has performed in plays such as Much Ado About Nothing, Versos de ciego, Le Bourgeois gentilhomme, and Casimiro Vico Primer Actor.

In an interview, the actress declared: "Eugenio Guzmán, the director of the play, first placed me in the choir and then chose me as a replacement for Silvia Piñeiro and there I stayed for several seasons." In a short time the play became a massive popular culture phenomenon. It occupied all the spaces that the media offered at that time, transforming image and sound into a true cultural sensation, making an international tour through Argentina, Mexico, and Europe.

Highlights of this period include plays such as Peligro a 50 metros, Nos tomamos la Universidad, and Antigone, the latter led by Víctor Jara. In 1972 she was invited to the Teatro Opera's Bim bam bum magazine, where she made several artistic presentations.

Along with this intimate love of theatrical art, Vidaurre participated in countless national and international tours of countries such as Argentina, Mexico, France, and Spain. Among the plays that were part of these itineraries were Tartuffe, Las chiquillas van a la pelea, Monólogos de Dario Fo, Las señoras de los jueves, and the comedy El rapto del galán de la teleserie.

Her television debut was in Canal 13 televised plays, giving her greater exposure.

In this period, she had notable friendships with the theater and television producer Sonia Fuchs (1931–1991), the actress and National Art Prize winner  (1925–2008) and the actress and writer María Elena Gertner (1932–2013).

During 2012 she participated in Javiera Contador and 's comedy program , with a parody of the program Mamá a los 15 named Mamá a los 80.

Later years
In theater she acted in Las chiquillas van a la pelea (2015) and Esperanzo la carroza (2016), playing Mamá Cora in the latter.

In 2015, she was the only woman to be a candidate (out of five selected) for the National Prize for Performing and Audiovisual Arts, whose winner was actor Héctor Noguera. In the same year, she received several tributes and recognitions for her vast career in the performing arts.

During 2015 she received several tributes and recognitions for her vast career in the performing arts.

In 2017, she was taken to a nursing home due to Alzheimer's disease, amid allegations that she had been forcibly hospitalized. She died from the disease on 1 June 2021, aged 92.

Theater
 1958 – Atahuicha, la reina de la selva, directed by 
 1959 – El ángel que nos mira, directed by Frank McMullan
 1959 – El diálogo de las carmelitas, directed by Eugenio Dittborn
 1960 – , directed by Eugenio Guzmán
 1961 – Versos de ciego
 1961 – La ronda de la buena nueva
 1963 – Much Ado About Nothing
 1964 – El tony chico, directed by Luis Alberto Heiremans
 1965 – Casimiro Vico Primer Actor
 1966 – Tiempo para convivir, directed by Hugo Miller
 El diálogo de las carmelitas
 Monólogos de Dario Fo
 1967 – Un negro en el cielo
 1969 – Nos tomamos la universidad, directed by Gustavo Meza
 1969 – Antigone, directed by Víctor Jara
 1970 – Todas las colorinas tienen pecas, directed by Eugenio Dittborn
 1971 – Paraíso para uno, directed by Eugenio Dittborn
 1972 – El pastor lobo (stories by Isabel Allende)
 1975 – Le Bourgeois gentilhomme, directed by Eugenio Dittborn
 1977 – Las señoras de los jueves, directed by Christian Villarreal
 1978 – Equus
 1981 – Los 7 pecados capitales
 1981 – Mary Stuart, directed by Raúl Osorio 
 1982 – Mama Rosa
 1983 – Como en la Gran Ciudad
 1984 – Testimonio de un sueño 
 1985 – Tartuffe
 1987 – El almacén de la vieja Justa
 1991 – La última noche que pasé contigo, directed by Roberto Nicolini
 1997 – Entre gallos y medianoche
 1998 – El caballero de la muerte
 1999 – Ni tonta ni perezosa, directed by Silva Gutiérrez
 2001 – Sol tardío, directed by Horacio Valdeavellano
 2002 – Déjame que te cuente que las abuelas sí son para el verano, directed by Roberto Nicolini
 2003 – Las chiquillas van a la pelea, directed by Katty Kowaleczko
 2003 – Más zarzuela, directed by Eduardo Soto
 2005 – De mi boca a tu boca, directed by Christian Villarreal
 2007 – El rapto del galán de la teleserie, directed by Christian Villarreal
 2008 – Sindicato de variedades
 2008 – Cena para dos
 2009 – Steel Magnolias
 2009 – Ellas quieren... él no puede
 2010 – Ella 80, yo 50
 2010 – La pérgola de las flores, directed by Silvia Santelices
 2010 – Los que van quedando en el camino, directed by Guillermo Calderón
 2011 – ¿Quién se queda con mamá?, directed by Christian Villarreal
 2012 – Casa de ejercicios espirituales, directed by Cristóbal García
 2013 – Vivan nuestros poetas, directed by José Peña
 2015 – Las chiquillas van a la pelea
 2016 – Amor a los 80
 2016 – La noche de san Juan
 2016 – Mamá Cora (Argentine adaptation of )

Telenovelas

TV series and specials

Film

Other appearances
 Viva el teatro (2005) - Various characters
  (Megavisión, 2012) - Guest
  (Chilevisión) - Guest

Awards and recognitions

APES Award

Enrique Silva Cimma Award

Other recognitions
 Career recognition from the Municipality of Villarrica, 2007
 Career award at the 16th Chillán International Film Festival, 2011
 Career recognition and tribute at the Theater Actors' Syndicate (SIDARTE), 2015
 Career award from the Rancagua Corporation of Culture and Illustrious Arts, 2015
 Career recognition from the Municipality of El Bosque, 2017

References

External links
 

1928 births
2021 deaths
20th-century Chilean actresses
21st-century Chilean actresses
Chilean film actresses
Chilean people of Belgian descent
Chilean people of German descent
Chilean stage actresses
Chilean telenovela actresses
People from Malleco Province
Deaths from dementia in Chile
Deaths from Alzheimer's disease
Pontifical Catholic University of Chile alumni